Sir Hugh Portman, 4th Baronet (died 1632) was an English politician who sat in the House of Commons  in two parliaments between 1625 and 1629.

Portman was the son of Sir John Portman, 1st Baronet and his wife Anne Gifford, daughter of Sir Henry Gifford. The baronetcy went successively to Sir John Portman's four sons, passing to Hugh on the death of Sir John Portman, 3rd Baronet unmarried in 1624.

In 1625, Portman was elected Member of Parliament for Taunton for the Useless Parliament. He was re-elected for Taunton in 1628 where he sat until 1629 when King Charles decided to rule without parliament. 
 
Portman died in 1632 and was succeeded by his brother William.

References

 

1632 deaths
Year of birth missing
Baronets in the Baronetage of England
English MPs 1625
English MPs 1628–1629